is a junction passenger railway station located in the city of Chigasaki, Kanagawa Prefecture, Japan. It is operated by the East Japan Railway Company (JR East).

Lines
It is also the southern terminus  of the 33.3 kilometer Sagami Line.

Station layout
Chigasaki Station has three island platforms with an elevated station building. The station has a Midori no Madoguchi staffed ticket office.

Platforms

The song "Kibō no Wadachi" by the Southern All-Stars began to be used as the departure melody for platforms 5 and 6 from 1 October 2014.

History
Chigasaki Station was opened on June 15, 1898 for both passenger and freight service as part of the section of the Japan National Railway (JNR) Tōkaidō Main Line connecting Yokohama with Kōzu. The adjacent Sagami Line station (then operated by the Sagami Railway opened on September 28, 1921. It was nationalized on June 1, 1944, becoming part of the Japan National Railways. Scheduled freight services were discontinued from 1984, and small parcel services from 1985. With the dissolution and privatization of the JNR on April 1, 1987, the station came under the operational control of the East Japan Railway Company. The north exit bus terminal was greatly expanded in 1996 and 1998. Automated turnstiles using the Suica IC Card system came into operation on November 18, 2001. The station building was reconstructed in 2006 to include a multi-story department store.

Passenger statistics
In fiscal 2019, the station was used by an average of 55,778 passengers daily (boarding passengers only).

The passenger figures (boarding passengers only) for previous years are as shown below.

Surrounding area
Chigasaki City Hall
Chigasaki Municipal Hospital
Chigasaki Citizens' Cultural Centerl
Kanagawa Prefectural Chigasaki High School
Kanagawa Prefectural Tsurumine High School
Chigasaki Tokushukai Hospital
Chigasaki City Library
Chigasaki City Museum of Art

See also
List of railway stations in Japan

References
Yoshikawa, Fumio. Tokaido-sen 130-nen no ayumi. Grand-Prix Publishing (2002)

External links

JR East Station Information

Railway stations in Kanagawa Prefecture
Sagami Line
Shōnan-Shinjuku Line
Tōkaidō Main Line
Railway stations in Japan opened in 1898
Chigasaki, Kanagawa